Wilton  was the name of a parliamentary borough in Wiltshire. It was represented in the House of Commons of the Parliament of England from 1295 to 1707, then in the Parliament of Great Britain from 1707 to 1800 and finally in the House of Commons of the United Kingdom of the Parliament of the United Kingdom from 1801 to 1918. It had two Members of Parliament (MPs) until 1832, but from 1832 to 1885 only one member, as a result of the Reform Act 1832 where it also adsorbed the former rotten borough of Old Sarum. In 1885 the borough was abolished, but the name of the constituency was then transferred to a new county constituency electing one Member from 1885 until 1918.

Boundaries
1885–1918: The Borough of Salisbury, the Sessional Divisions of Amesbury, Hindon, and Salisbury, and the civil parishes of Figheldean, Fisherton-de-la-Mere, Milston, and Wily.

Stonehenge was within the constituency from 1885 until the seat disappeared in 1918, since when it has been in the Salisbury seat.

Members of Parliament

Wilton borough

MPs 1295–1640

MPs 1640–1832

MPs 1832–1885

Wiltshire, Southern or Wilton Division

MPs 1885–1918

Election results

Elections in the 1830s

Elections in the 1840s

Harris succeeded to the peerage, becoming 3rd Earl of Malmesbury, causing a by-election.

Elections in the 1850s

A'Court resigned after being appointed a Special Commissioner of Property and Income Tax in Ireland, causing a by-election.

Elections in the 1860s

Elections in the 1870s

Antrobus resigned, causing a by-election.

Elections in the 1880s

Herbert was appointed a Lord Commissioner of the Treasury, requiring a by-election.

Elections in the 1890s

Elections in the 1900s

Elections in the 1910s

General Election 1914–15:

Another General Election was required to take place before the end of 1915. The political parties had been making preparations for an election to take place and by July 1914, the following candidates had been selected; 
Unionist: Charles Bathurst
Liberal: Charles Leach

References

Robert Beatson, A Chronological Register of Both Houses of Parliament (London: Longman, Hurst, Res & Orme, 1807) 
D Brunton & D H Pennington, Members of the Long Parliament (London: George Allen & Unwin, 1954)
Cobbett's Parliamentary history of England, from the Norman Conquest in 1066 to the year 1803 (London: Thomas Hansard, 1808) 
 The Constitutional Year Book for 1913 (London: National Union of Conservative and Unionist Associations, 1913)
F W S Craig, British Parliamentary Election Results 1832-1885 (2nd edition, Aldershot: Parliamentary Research Services, 1989)
 J Holladay Philbin, Parliamentary Representation 1832 - England and Wales (New Haven: Yale University Press, 1965)

Parliamentary constituencies in Wiltshire (historic)
Constituencies of the Parliament of the United Kingdom established in 1295
Constituencies of the Parliament of the United Kingdom disestablished in 1918